Sllave Llambi (26 June 1919 – 1985) was an Albanian football midfielder. He was also coach of Albania for a time.

Club career
Llambi is considered to be the first Albanian that has ever won a "Scudetto" in Italy's Serie A (with Bologna F.C. in the 1940–1941 season), although he never played a match during that year.

International career
He made his debut for Albania in an August 1946 friendly match against Montenegro and earned a total of 19 caps, scoring no goals. His final international was an October 1950 friendly match against Romania.

Honours
Kategoria Superiore: 4
  1937, 1947, 1948, 1949

References

External links

1919 births
1985 deaths
Footballers from Tirana
Albanian footballers
Association football midfielders
Albania international footballers
KF Tirana players
S.S.D. Città di Brindisi players
Bologna F.C. 1909 players
Inter Milan players
FK Partizani Tirana players
Albanian expatriate footballers
Expatriate footballers in Italy
Albanian expatriate sportspeople in Italy
Albanian football managers
Albania national football team managers
FK Partizani Tirana managers
A.S.D. Fanfulla players